The whistle register (also called the flute register or flageolet register) is the highest register of the human voice, lying above the modal register and falsetto register. This register has a specific physiological production that is different from the other registers and is so-called because the timbre of the notes that are produced from this register is similar to that of a whistle.

In some sopranos, the modal register vocal production may extend into what is usually thought of as the whistle register.

Physiology and definition 
The whistle register is the highest phonational register, that in most singers begins above the soprano "high D" (D6 or 1174.6 Hz) and extends to about an octave above (D7 or 2349.3 Hz). It is created by using only the back of the vocal folds. The lower part of the whistle register may overlap the upper parts of the modal and falsetto registers, making it possible for singers to phonate these notes in different ways. However, fundamentally the whistle register is most commonly used to produce pitches above D6. As with the other vocal registers, the whistle register does not begin at the same point within every voice, and there are rare voices that can extend the whistle register much higher or lower than the range listed above. For example, most operatic coloratura sopranos can sing up to the "high" F above "high" C without entering into the whistle register. Cleo Laine from the United Kingdom and Yma Sumac, from Peru, are two singers (contralto and soprano respectively) with extreme vocal ranges.

The physiology of the whistle register is the least understood of the vocal registers. Unlike other types of vocal production, it is difficult to film the vocal cords while they are operating in this manner as the epiglottis closes down over the larynx and the resonating chamber assumes its smallest dimensions. It is known that when producing pitches in this register, vibration occurs only in some anterior portion of the vocal folds. This shorter vibrating length naturally allows for easier production of high pitches.

Although the whole physiological production of whistle tone is not understood, it is known that when the lateral cricoarytenoid muscles are active but the transverse arytenoid muscles inactive, a triangular opening is seen between the arytenoids, the vocal processes contact each other, but the posterior parts at the apex do not contact each other. The exception to this would be if the vocal folds are not stretched, as stretching of the vocal ligaments abducts (moves away from) the vocal processes.

Use in music 

In European classical music, the whistle register is used primarily by coloratura sopranos. Many parts in the coloratura soprano repertoire extend beyond "high C" and often extend up to high F (F6 or 1396.9 Hz). Although many coloratura sopranos use whistle tone vocal production to sing these notes, some operatic sopranos are capable of singing up to "high F" without utilizing the vocal production associated with the whistle register but remaining in the modal register. However, most coloratura sopranos do utilize the whistle register, particularly when singing staccato notes in rapid succession, during high trills, or other elaborate coloratura ornamentation in the upper tessitura. Rarely will coloraturas use whistle tone when doing high extended notes. However, singers like Mado Robin were noted for doing so.

In popular music, the whistle register is used with more variety and to produce much higher pitches than are called for in classical music. It has mostly been used by female singers, with notable examples being Minnie Riperton, Betty Wright, Mariah Carey, Christina Aguilera and Ariana Grande. 

Some male singers can also make use of the whistle register, including Vitas, Adam Lopez, Dimash Kudaibergen, Howie Dorough and Wang Xiaolong. Amirhossein Molaei holds the Guinness Book of Records title for the highest vocal note produced by a man (F#8, 5989 Hz). Female singer Georgia Brown was listed in the 2005 Guinness World Records for highest note (G10 or 25 kHz) ever reached, but this claim was removed when the 2007 edition was issued, since no recording that would prove the note being real was ever released.

See also 
Vocal register

References

Further reading

External links 
Whistle register at SITE123

Singing
Voice registers
Human voice